Ahmadabad (also Romanized as Aḩmadābād) is a village in Tabas-e Masina Rural District, Gazik District, Darmian County, South Khorasan Province, Iran. At the 2006 census, its population was 664, in 119 families.

References 

Populated places in Darmian County